Iceland is unusually suited for waterfalls (Icelandic: s. foss, pl. fossar). This island country has a north Atlantic climate that produces frequent rain and snow and a near-Arctic location that produces large glaciers, whose summer melts feed many rivers. As a result, it is home to a number of large and powerful waterfalls.

North 
 Dettifoss is the most powerful waterfall in Iceland.
 Gljúfursárfoss
 Selfoss
 Hafragilsfoss
 Goðafoss 
 Aldeyjarfoss

South 
 Faxi or Vatnsleysufoss in Tungufljót river
 Foss á Síðu
 Gluggafoss
 Gljúfrafoss
 Gjáin has many small waterfalls
 Gullfoss (Golden Falls)
 Háifoss (High Falls)
 Hjálparfoss
 Merkjárfoss
 Ófærufoss used to be noted for the impressive natural bridge which stood above the falls, but it collapsed in 1993.
 Seljalandsfoss
 Skógafoss (Forest Falls)
 Svartifoss (Black Falls) is one of the many waterfalls of Skaftafell National Park
 Systrafoss, in Kirkjubæjarklaustur
 Þjófafoss on the Merkurhraun lava fields
 Öxarárfoss, at Þingvellir National Park
 Fagrifoss, near Kirkjubæjarklaustur
 Morsárfoss, 228m waterfall formed from the retreat of Morsárjökull that is now Iceland's tallest.
 Urriðafoss

West 
 Álafoss
 Barnafossar (the Children's Falls) in Hvítá river
 Glymur in the Hvalfjörður area. At 198m, it was long regarded as the tallest waterfall in Iceland until being surpassed with a new falls by Morsárjökull in 2011.
 Hraunfossar (the Lava Falls) in birchwoods, a stone's throw from Barnafoss.

Westfjords 
 Dynjandi, sometimes called Fjallfoss.

East 
 Hengifoss 
 Litlanesfoss, surrounded by columnar basalt, it is on the way up to Hengifoss 
 Fardagafoss and Onno-Óltifoss near Egilsstaðir
 Gufufoss ("Steam falls") In Seyðisfjörður
 Klifbrekkufossar in Mjóifjörður. A beautiful row of waterfalls

List of waterfalls by height

See also 
 List of waterfalls

References

External links 
Iceland's Best Waterfalls
Iceland Waterfalls
 Photo of Hangifoss
 Photo of Goðafoss
 Photos of Waterfalls in Iceland
 Photos of Skogafoss waterfall, Iceland

Waterfalls
 
Iceland